Kimbolton is a village and parish in Herefordshire, England, around  north east of Leominster and  north of Hereford. The village is on the A4112 road, near its junction with the A49 road.  The church is dedicated to St James, has 13th-century features and has two Norman windows in the chancel.  The spire is shingled.

The parish had a population in mid-2010 of 434, increasing to 472 at the 2011 Census.

The village has a pub, The Stockton Cross and a Primary School with a separate Early Years nursery on site. There is also a village hall. 

Kimbolton Chapel (now Kimbolton St James church) is one of the rumoured burial sites for Owain Glyndwr.

References

Villages in Herefordshire